The 17th World Paragliding Championships was held from 31 October to 13 November 2021 in San Miguel de Tucumán, Argentina. In this competition started 150 pilots from 37 nations.

Medalists

Tasks

Results

Overall 
Source:

Women 
Source:

Nation 
Source:

References

External links 
 FAI
 Website

Paragliding
International sports competitions hosted by Argentina
2021 in Argentine sport
Sport in San Miguel de Tucumán
October 2021 sports events in Argentina
November 2021 sports events in Argentina